The Understudy is a 2008 black comedy film directed by David Conolly and Hannah Davis.

Plot

Rebecca is an unemployed actress who is living with an equally unsuccessful screenwriter, Sarfras. Rebecca makes a living by caring for a blind and diabetic woman while going from one disastrous relationship to the next.

Rebecca is invited to understudy the famous movie star Simone Harwin (from the Drive By trilogy), in the play Electra. Although Rebecca's unfulfillment is compounded: despite outshining the Action Star with her own talent, Rebecca is treated as second class, either bullied or ignored by the cast and crew including the director Ian, the stage manager Alison. Her salvation lies within the relationship with the seemingly perfect Firefighter Bobby.

Accidents start to disrupt the leading ladies of Electra and Rebecca's star begins to rise, suspicion surrounds her. Can Rebecca hold on to the leading role and her freedom?

Cast
Marin Ireland as Rebecca
Paul Sparks as Bobby
Aasif Mandvi as Sarfras
Richard Kind as Ian
Tom Wopat as Detective Jones
Gloria Reuben as Greta
Reiko Aylesworth as Kinsky
Kerry Bishé as April
Jean Boht as Mrs. Davido
Adrian Martinez as Guard
Kelli Giddish as Simone

References

External links
 
 Mansion Pictures

2008 films
British black comedy films
2008 black comedy films
2008 comedy films
2000s English-language films
2000s British films
Films scored by Carl Davis